A reunion tour is a concert tour following the reunion of a band or group.

Reunion Tour may also refer to:

Reunion Tour (Black Sabbath), 2012–2014
Reunion Tour (Phoebe Bridgers), 2021–2023
Reunion Tour (The Police), 2007–2008
Reunion Tour (Refused), 2012
Reunion Tour (The Stone Roses), 2012–2013
Reunion Tour (album), 2007 album by The Weakerthans
My Chemical Romance Reunion Tour, 2019-2023